Crombrugghia laetus, also known as the scarce light plume is a moth of the family Pterophoridae, found in southern Europe, North Africa, the Canary Islands, Asia Minor and Iraq. It was first described by the  German entomologist, Philipp Christoph Zeller in 1847.

Description
The forewings are light brownish-ochreous, more or less suffused with fuscous with two obscure whitish bars on the segments. The cilia have a few black scales. The costal and dorsal have  whitish bars. The hindwings are dark grey. The dorsal scale-tooth at 2/3 is small.

The larvae feed on the flowers of Andryala species including common Andryala (Andryala integrifolia), Andryala pinnatifida and Hieracium tomentosum.

References

Oxyptilini
Insects of the Canary Islands
Moths described in 1847
Plume moths of Africa
Plume moths of Asia
Plume moths of Europe
Taxa named by Philipp Christoph Zeller